Thomas Waller may refer to:

Politics
 Thomas M. Waller (1840–1924), American politician, Democrat from Connecticut
 Thomas Waller (fl. 1421–1435), English politician, MP for Guildford
Thomas Waller (died 1613)  (c. 1569–1613), MP for Dover
Thomas Wathen Waller, United Kingdom ambassador to Belgium (1845–1846)

Media
 Fats Waller (Thomas Waller, 1904–1943), American jazz pianist, organist, composer and comedic entertainer
 Tom Waller (born 1974), film producer and director